The 68th Battalion (Regina), CEF was an infantry battalion of the Canadian Expeditionary Force during the Great War. The 68th Battalion was authorized on 20 April 1915 and embarked for Britain on 28 April 1916. It provided reinforcements for the Canadian Corps in the field until 6 July 1916, when its personnel were absorbed by the 32nd Reserve Battalion, CEF. The battalion was disbanded on 21 May 1917.

The 68th Battalion recruited in Regina and district and Moose Jaw and district, in Saskatchewan and was mobilized at Regina.

The battalion was commanded by Lt.-Col. T.E. Perrott, from 1 May 1916 to 6 July 1916.

The 68th Battalion was awarded the battle honour THE GREAT WAR 1916.

The 68th Battalion (Regina), CEF is perpetuated by The Royal Regina Rifles.

References

Sources
Canadian Expeditionary Force 1914-1919 by Col. G.W.L. Nicholson, CD, Queen's Printer, Ottawa, Ontario, 1962

068
Military units and formations of Saskatchewan
Royal Regina Rifles